The following is an incomplete list of festivals in Asia, with links to separate lists by country and region where applicable. This list includes festivals of diverse types, including regional festivals, commerce festivals, film festivals, folk festivals, carnivals, recurring festivals on holidays, and music festivals. Music festivals are annotated "(music)" for countries where there is not a dedicated music section.

This list has overlap with List of film festivals in Asia.

Sovereign states

Afghanistan 

Nowruz in Afghanistan
Baloch-Pakhtun Unity Day

Armenia 

 Dolma Festival in Armenia (cultural heritage, gastronomy)
 Golden Apricot Yerevan International Film Festival (film)
 MetalFront Fest (music)
 Pan-Armenian Games (sports)
 ReAnimania International Animation Film & Comics Art Festival of Yerevan
 Yerevan International Film Festival (film)

Azerbaijan 

Baku International Film Festival East-West (film)
Baku International Tourism Film Festival (film)
Chaharshanbe Suri
Goychay Pomegranate Festival
Nowruz
Yaldā

Music festivals in Azerbaijan

Baku International Jazz Festival
Gabala International Music Festival
International World of Mugham Festival
Mstislav Rostropovich Baku International Festival
Mugham Festival
Uzeyir Hajibeyov International Music Festival

Bahrain 

Public holidays in Bahrain

Bangladesh 

Public holidays in Bangladesh
List of festivals in Bangladesh

Bhutan 

Public holidays in Bhutan
Tshechu

Brunei 

Public holidays in Brunei

Cambodia 

Asalha Puja
Bon Om Touk
CamboFest, Cambodia Film Festival (film)
Magha Puja
Pchum Ben

China 

 Chinese New Year
 Chinese Lantern Festival
 Dragon Boat Festival or Duanwu Festival
 Mid-Autumn Festival

Cyprus

East Timor (Timor-Leste) 

Public holidays in East Timor

Georgia

India 

List of festivals in India 
List of Indian classical music festivals
List of literary festivals in India
List of religious festivals in India
List of festivals of Maharashtrian Brahmins
List of Sikh festivals
List of Sindhi festivals
List of Hindu festivals
Public Holidays in India
List of Hindu festivals in Punjab

Lists by region

List of fairs and festivals in Punjab
List of festivals of West Bengal

Indonesia 

List of festivals in Indonesia

Iran 

List of festivals in Iran

Iraq

Duhok International Film Festival (film)
Iraq Short Film Festival (film)
Kha b-Nisan
Nowruz

Israel

Japan 

Japanese festivals (traditional/cultural)
List of festivals in Japan
Festivals in Tokyo
Kamakura's festivals and events
Ryukyuan festivals and observances

Jordan 
 
Al-Balad Music Festival (music)
Jerash Festival
New Think Festival

Kazakhstan 
 
Eurasia International Film Festival (film)
International Astana Action Film Festival (film)
Shaken's Stars (film)
Voice of Asia (music)

North Korea 

Festivals of Korea (traditional festivals and holidays)
Modern Korean festivals (by region)
13th World Festival of Youth and Students
Arirang Festival

South Korea 

List of modern Korean festivals (by region)
List of film festivals in South Korea
List of music festivals in South Korea
List of fireworks festivals in South Korea
 Busan International Fireworks Festival
 Seoul International Fireworks Festival 
List of traditional Korean festivals

Kuwait
 
Qurain Cultural Festival

Kyrgyzstan
Public holidays in Kyrgyzstan

Laos 

List of festivals in Laos

Lebanon
 
Baalbeck International Festival (music)
Beirut Nights (music)  
Beirut Rock Festival (music)
Beiteddine Festival (music)
Byblos International Festival (music)
Coma Dance Festival (music)
Ehmej Festival (music)
Eid il-Burbara

Malaysia

 
List of festivals in Malaysia

Maldives
Public holidays in the Maldives

Mongolia

Eagle festival
Garid
Naadam (traditional sports)
Nadun
Tsagaan Sar

Myanmar
 
Irrawaddy Literary Festival
Kathina
List of Burmese traditional festivals
Magha Puja
Pagoda festival
Tazaungdaing festival
Thadingyut Festival
Thingyan
Yadana Cave Festival
Wathann Film Fest (film)

Nepal 

List of festivals in Nepal

Oman 
Public holidays in Oman

Pakistan 

List of festivals in Pakistan
List of festivals in Lahore
List of festivals in Multan

Philippines 

List of festivals in the Philippines

Qatar 
  
Doha Tribeca Film Festival (film)
Public holidays in Qatar

Russia 
  
List of festivals in Russia

Saudi Arabia 
  
Jenadriyah
Public holidays in Saudi Arabia

Singapore 
  
List of festivals in Singapore

Sri Lanka 

 
Aluth Sahal Mangallaya 
Asalha Puja
Full Moon Poya Festivals
Esala Mangallaya 
Kandy Esala Perahera 
List of traditional festivals in Sri Lanka
Magha Puja
Saga (music)
Sinhalese New Year

Syria 
  
2008 Arab Capital of Culture 
Damascus International Film Festival (film)
Dox Box 
Eid il-Burbara 
Kha b-Nisan 
Nowruz 
Thursday of the Dead

Tajikistan 

Didor International Film Festival
Public holidays in Tajikistan

Thailand

Turkey 

List of festivals in Turkey

Turkmenistan 
  
Public holidays in Turkmenistan

United Arab Emirates

Uzbekistan 
  
Asrlar Sadosi Festival of Traditional Culture
Public holidays in Uzbekistan

Vietnam 

Coca-Cola SoundFest (music)
Cold Food Festival
Dalat Flower Festival
Hùng Kings' Festival
Gióng Festival
List of traditional festivals in Vietnam
Tết Trung Thu
Tết Nguyên Đán
Tết Đoan Ngọ

Yemen 
Public holidays in Yemen

States with limited recognition

Abkhazia 
Public holidays in Abkhazia

Nagorno-Karabakh 
Culture of Nagorno-Karabakh

Northern Cyprus
  
Public holidays in Northern Cyprus

Palestine 

Culture of Palestine
Palestine Festival of Literature
Bet Lahem Live Festival

South Ossetia
Culture of South Ossetia

Taiwan

Tibet

List of traditional Tibetan festivals

Dependencies and other territories

British Indian Ocean Territory

Christmas Island 
Public holidays in Christmas Island

Cocos (Keeling) Islands
Culture of the Cocos (Keeling) Islands

Hong Kong

Macau 
 
List of festivals in Macau

See also

List of festivals
List of film festivals
List of music festivals

References

External links

Region topic template using suffix
 
₵Asia